The Richard Howe House, located at 315 E. Logan Ave. in Emporia, Kansas, was built in about 1866–67.  It was listed on the National Register of Historic Places in 1986.

It was deemed notable for "its historical association with the development of Emporia, Kansas (est. 1857) and for its architectural significance as a rare, extant example of a first settlement period limestone structure."

It was built by stonemason Richard Howe (1825-1910).  It is a two-story, three-bay, gable roofed limestone building with vernacular style, with elements of Federal and Greek Revival architecture.

References

Houses on the National Register of Historic Places in Kansas
Houses completed in 1867
Lyon County, Kansas